The 1995 Torneo Godó was the 43rd edition of the Torneo Godó, a men's tennis tournament that took place on outdoor clay courts at the Real Club de Tenis Barcelona in Barcelona, Spain from 10 April through 17 April 1995. The event was part of the Championship Series of the 1995 ATP Tour. Thomas Muster won the singles title.

Finals

Singles

 Thomas Muster defeated  Magnus Larsson, 6–2, 6–1, 6–4
 It was Muster's 3rd singles title of the year and the 26th of his career.

Doubles

 Trevor Kronemann /  David Macpherson defeated  Andrea Gaudenzi /  Goran Ivanišević, 6–2, 6–4

References

External links
 ITF tournament edition details
 ATP tournament profile

Torneo Godo
Barcelona Open (tennis)
Godo